The 1948 National League Division Two was the third post-war season of the second tier of motorcycle speedway in Great Britain. Edinburgh Monarchs were new participants as the league was extended to 9 teams.

Bristol Bulldogs were crowned champions, whilst Wigan Warriors were replaced by Fleetwood Flyers after just 3 away matches with their entire team transferring.

32-year-old Bill Wilson of the Middlesbrough Bears was fatally injured, on 3 July at Norwich and died two days later in hospital.

Final table

 Wigan Warriors were replaced by Fleetwood Flyers after 3 away matches

The Anniversary Cup for Division Two was run in a league format. Birmingham Brummies came out on top.

Anniversary Cup (Div 2) Final table

Top Five Riders (League only)

National Trophy
The 1948 Trophy (sponsored by the Daily Mail) was the 11th edition of the Knockout Cup. The Qualifying event for Division 3 teams saw Southampton Saints win the final and qualify for the Elimination event. The Elimination event for Division 2 teams saw Birmingham Brummies win the final and qualify for the Quarter Finals proper.

Elimination Event First Round

Elimination Second Round

Elimination Third Round

Elimination Final
First leg

Second leg

See also
List of United Kingdom Speedway League Champions
Knockout Cup (speedway)

References

Speedway National League Division Two
1948 in British motorsport
1948 in speedway